Rajesh Agarwal is an Indian politician belonging to the Bharatiya Janata Party who is currently serving as its National Treasurer and former Minister of finance in the Government of Uttar Pradesh. He previously served as Cabinet Minister of trade tax and institutional finance in 2001, and as Deputy Speaker of Uttar Pradesh Legislative Assembly from 2003 to 2007. He then served as the Finance cabinet minister again from 2017 to 2019 in the Yogi government. He resigned as cabinet minister after he had reached 75 years of age. BJP promoted him as the National Treasurer of BJP. 

Agarwal was a member of the assembly elected from Bareilly Cantoment. He had continuously held the seat for 29 years in the Uttar Pradesh Legislative assembly. He holds several key positions in the Bharatiya Janata party.

Positions Held 
Rajesh Agarwal has been elected to Uttar Pradesh Legislative Assembly for 6 terms.

References

Deputy Speakers of the Uttar Pradesh Legislative Assembly
Uttar Pradesh MLAs 2002–2007
Politicians from Bareilly
Living people
Uttar Pradesh MLAs 2007–2012
Bharatiya Janata Party politicians from Uttar Pradesh
Yogi ministry
State cabinet ministers of Uttar Pradesh
Year of birth missing (living people)